Austin Marlow Arnett (born October 22, 1991) is a  mixed martial artist (MMA) who currently competes in the Featherweight division of CES MMA. A professional mixed martial artist since 2012, Arnett also competed in the UFC.

Background 
Arnett started training in his father Frank Arnett's karate school at a young age. After buying many Gracie Jiu Jitsu DVD's and attending seminars, he was able to develop his ground game to go along with his karate background. He transitioned to MMA at the age of 13 when his father opened up an MMA gym and completed his first amateur MMA bout two years later.

Mixed martial arts career

Early career 
Arnett started his professional MMA career in 2012 and fought primarily on the regional circuit of the Pacific Northwest United States. He amassed a record of 15–3 before signed by UFC.

Dana White's Tuesday Night Contention Series 
Arnett faced Brandon Davis on August 1, 2017 at Dana White's Contender Series 4. He lost the fight via unanimous decision.

Ultimate Fighting Championship 
Arnett made his promotional debut on January 27, 2018 against Cory Sandhagen at UFC on Fox 27. He lost the fight via technical knockout in round two.

His next fight came on July 28, 2018 at UFC on Fox 30 against Hakeem Dawodu. He lost the fight via unanimous decision.

Arnett faced Humberto Bandenay on November 17, 2018 at UFC Fight Night: Magny vs. Ponzinibbio. He won the fight via unanimous decision.

Arnett faced Shane Young on February 10, 2019 at UFC 234. He lost the fight via unanimous decision.

In September 2019, it was reported that Arnett was released by UFC.

Post-UFC career 
After the release, Arnett was scheduled to challenge Rolando Dy for the UAE Warriors Featherweight Championship at UAE Warriors 8 on October 19, 2019. However, Arnett withdrew from the bout and was replaced by Do Gyeom Lee.

He made his promotional debut against Elias Boudegzdame at UAE Warriors 10 on January 31, 2020. He lost the fight via unanimous decision.

Arnett was scheduled to face Dinis Paiva in a featherweight bout at CES MMA 61 on April 24, 2020. However, the event was postponed indefinitely due to the COVID-19 pandemic.

Arnett faced Daniel Vega in a catchweight bout at UAE Warriors 18 on March 20, 2021. He won the fight via third-round knockout.

Arnett is now again scheduled to challenge for the UAE Warriors Featherweight Championship against Do Gyeom Lee at UAE Warriors 24 on October 29, 2021.

Mixed martial arts record

|-
|Win
|align=center|18–7
|Nathan Stolen
|Submission (rear-naked choke)
|Front Street Fights 24
|
|align=center|4
|align=center|1:26
|Boise, Idaho, United States
|
|-
|Win
|align=center|17–7
|Daniel Vega
|KO (punches)
|UAE Warriors 18
|
|align=center|3
|align=center|2:40
|Abu Dhabi, United Arab Emirates
|
|-
|Loss
|align=center|16–7
|Elias Boudegzdame 
|Decision (unanimous)
|UAE Warriors 10
|
|align=center|3
|align=center|5:00
|Abu Dhabi, United Arab Emirates 
|
|-
|Loss
|align=center|16–6
|Shane Young
|Decision (unanimous)
|UFC 234
|
|align=center|3
|align=center|5:00
|Melbourne, Australia 
|
|-
|Win
|align=center|16–5
|Humberto Bandenay
|Decision (unanimous)
|UFC Fight Night: Magny vs. Ponzinibbio
|
|align=center|3
|align=center|5:00
|Buenos Aires, Argentina
|
|-
|Loss
|align=center|15–5
|Hakeem Dawodu
|Decision (unanimous)
|UFC on Fox: Alvarez vs. Poirier 2
|
|align=center|3
|align=center|5:00
|Calgary, Alberta, Canada
|
|-
|Loss
|align=center|15–4
|Cory Sandhagen
|TKO (punches)
|UFC on Fox: Jacaré vs. Brunson 2
|
|align=center|2
|align=center|3:48
|Charlotte, North Carolina, United States
|
|-
|Loss
|align=center|15–3
|Brandon Davis
|Decision (unanimous)
|Dana White's Contender Series 4
|
|align=center|3
|align=center|5:00
|Las Vegas, Nevada, United States
|
|-
|Win
|align=center|15–2
|Jake Jokela
|Submission (triangle choke)
|ExciteFight: Conquest of the Cage
|
|align=center|2
|align=center|1:08
|Airway Heights, Washington, United States
|
|-
|Win
|align=center|14–2
|Chris Dempsey
|TKO (punches)
|Thunder & Lightning: Pro-Am MMA
|
|align=center|1
|align=center|3:09
|Lewiston, Idaho, United States
|
|-
|Win
|align=center|13–2
|Jerome Jones
|Submission (rear-naked choke)
|Conquest of the Cage 24
|
|align=center|1
|align=center|4:49
|Airway Heights, Washington, United States
|
|-
|Win
|align=center|12–2
|Charon Spain
|Submission (rear-naked choke)
|Thunder & Lightning: Pro-Am MMA
|
|align=center|2
|align=center|3:54
|Lewiston, Idaho, United States
|
|-
|Win
|align=center|11–2
|Dave Burrow
|Decision (unanimous)
|Titan FC 37
|
|align=center|3
|align=center|5:00
|Ridgefield, Washington, United States
|
|-
|Win
|align=center|10–2
|Matt Coble
|Decision (unanimous)
|ExciteFight: Supreme MMA Showdown
|
|align=center|3
|align=center|5:00
|Tulalip, Washington, United States
|
|-
|Win
|align=center|9–2
|Nathan Thompson
|KO
|Conquest of the Cage 21
|
|align=center|1
|align=center|1:02
|Airway Heights, Washington, United States
|
|-
|Win
|align=center|8–2
|Joseph Cleveland
|TKO (punches)
|KOTC: Bad Reputation
|
|align=center|1
|align=center|1:10
|Worley, Idaho, United States
|
|-
|Win
|align=center|7–2
|Steve Wing
|TKO (submission to punches)
|ExciteFight: MMA Mission Mayhem
|
|align=center|1
|align=center|0:41
|Pendleton, Oregon, United States
|
|-
|Win
|align=center|6–2
|Josh Solis
|Submission (guillotine choke)
|ExciteFight: March Mayhem
|
|align=center|1
|align=center|0:15
|Pendleton, Oregon, United States
|
|-
|Win
|align=center|5–2
|Tony Reyes
|Decision (unanimous)
|Conquest of the Cage 17
|
|align=center|3
|align=center|5:00
|Pendleton, Oregon, United States
|
|-
|Win
|align=center|4–2
|Donald Gouge
|TKO (punches)
|Conquest of the Cage 16
|
|align=center|1
|align=center|1:38
|Airway Heights, Washington, United States
|
|-
|Win
|align=center|3–2
|Chris Ensley
|KO (punch)
|Thunder N Lightning 19
|
|align=center|1
|align=center|1:50
|Lewiston, Idaho, United States
|
|-
|Loss
|align=center|2–2
|Clinton Teeples
|Submission (guillotine choke)
|Conquest of the Cage 14
|
|align=center|1
|align=center|1:13
|Airway Heights, Washington, United States
|
|-
|Win
|align=center|2–1
|Daniel Atnip
|Submission (guillotine choke)
|Conquest of the Cage 13
|
|align=center|1
|align=center| N/A
|Airway Heights, Washington, United States
|
|-
|Loss
|align=center|1–1
|Eduardo Torres
|Decision (unanimous)
|CageSport 22
|
|align=center|3
|align=center|5:00
|Fife, Washington, United States
|
|-
|Win
|align=center|1–0
|John Martinez
|TKO (punches)
|Thunder & Lightning: Rumble on the River
|
|align=center|1
|align=center|2:44
|Lewiston, Idaho, United States
|
|-

Championships and accomplishments
Front Street Fights
FSF Lightweight Championship (One time; current)

Professional boxing record

See also 
 List of male mixed martial artists

References

External links 
 
 
 

1991 births
Living people
American male mixed martial artists
Mixed martial artists from Washington (state)
Mixed martial artists from Idaho
Featherweight mixed martial artists
Mixed martial artists utilizing karate
Mixed martial artists utilizing boxing
Mixed martial artists utilizing Brazilian jiu-jitsu
Ultimate Fighting Championship male fighters
American male boxers
Boxers from Washington (state)
Boxers from Idaho
American male karateka
American practitioners of Brazilian jiu-jitsu
People from Lewiston, Idaho
People from Clarkston, Washington